Helsinki Rugby Club (colloquially known as HRC) is a Finnish rugby club based in Helsinki. Founded in 1999, it is the oldest and biggest (in terms of registered players) club in Finland. They currently play in the Finnish Championship League, competing with both men and women teams in XV's and 7's.

Teams, club logo and colors
HRC comprises three different teams:
men's 1st team, nicknamed Big Guns (XV) and Mini Guns (7s);
women's team, nicknamed Ladies (XV and 7s);
men's development team, nicknamed Blue Tigers (XV) and Tiger Cubs (7s).

Since 2021, HRC has also launched a youth programme and started the U17 beginners' team, to develop future rugby players and help contributing to the growth of the rugby movement in Finland.

The club logo shows the nationalities involved in the formation of the club: Finnish, English, French, South African and Australian. The club colors, blue and white, are taken from the finnish flag.

Early history (1999-2019)
The inspiration to form Helsinki Rugby Club came during some rugby discussions in Molly Malone’s Irish Bar in Helsinki between some rugby friends in 1999. In its first season HRC played one game, narrowly lost to a representative team from Sweden.
In 2000, the club was granted its first official home ground in Myllypuro by the Helsinki City Council. The club also claimed its first victory against a team representing British Navy ship HMS Sheffield, took part in the Stockholm 10's Tournament for the first time and organized the first edition of the Baltic Plate 10-a-side Tournament.

Finnish National Championship was launched in 2002 and HRC claimed the title, which was followed by another championship win in 2003. Some HRC players were selected to play in Norway vs. Finland international match in 2002.

In 2004, the club had its first tour abroad, in Riga, Latvia. In the same year, Finland played its first home international game, which was hosted and organized by HRC.
In 2006, HRC women's team participated to the inaugural Women’s Finnish Championship.
In 2008, Baltic Plate Tournament was transformed into Midnight Rugby Tournament and took its position as an annual mid-June rugby party in Helsinki, until its last edition in 2019.
In 2009, the club celebrated its 10 year anniversary in the British Embassy.

The inaugural men’s 7’s championship was launched in 2010 and HRC took the first ever title. Both in 2010 and 2011 HRC men advanced to the semi-finals in the XV’s Championship, only to suffer last-minute losses in both games. In 2011, men’s 7’s team was invited to Moscow for European 7’s Champions Trophy.
In 2012, HRC Ladies re-enter the women’s championship after few years hiatus.
In 2013, the club organized the Finnish Championship finals in Helsinki, attracting the (then) highest-ever amount of spectators at a Finnish rugby game.

After an eleven-year drought, men claimed the XV’s championship in 2014. At the same time, HRC Ladies advanced to the finals first time in their history, finishing in the runner-up position.
A year later, in 2015, the tables turned as Ladies celebrated their first ever XV’s title, while men narrowly lost the title in the final. Men’s 7’s team won the 7’s championship title and HRC men’s 2nd team won the Division 1.

HRC’s finest hour was truly in 2016, when the club accomplished its first and only double-double: both men and women retrieved both the 7’s and XV’s championships. Men’s 7’s team got a taste of European top level rugby as they participated to European 7’s Champions Trophy in Saint Petersburg, Russia.

2017 was another successful year, as both men and women reclaimed the 7’s titles and finished in the runner-up position in their respective championships. The club also participated in traditional Ghent Easter 7’s tournament and finished in men and women’s competitions second and third, respectively.

Recent years (2020-Present)

XVs

2020 Season 
Despite the COVID-19 pandemic, HRC had a particularly successful season in 2020, achieving a solid roster depth for both Big Guns and Blue Tigers. The short schedule saw the Big Guns, led by returning coach Jake Pratley, go undefeated throughout the regular season: after a draw with OTS Porvoo for 24-24 in the season opener, HRC went on to defeat Jyväskylä (59-10), Turku Eagles (17-14), Kuopio (79-0), Warriors (27-14) and Kalev (47-0). In the championship final, held in Otaniemi, HRC defeated Warriors for 40-29, winning their fifth national title. HRC number eight Wertti Bask also won the Player of the Year award.

Blue Tigers, under first-time coach Jussi Tamminen, had a positive year, tying with Pori at the top of the division at the end of the regular season. In the Division 1 final matchup, Pori defeated HRC for 23-5.

Ladies started the 2020 season under coach Mikko Aalto seeking to defend their 2019 title, but after an opening win against Jyväskylä (7-12) they suffered losses against title contenders Tampere (5-46) and Turku Swans (10-24). HRC reached the third place in the regular season thanks to following wins against Warriors (7-31) and Kuopio (26-0), but the run for the title stopped in the semifinal against Turku Swans (7-13).

2021 Season 
In 2021, the rugby season was once again threatened by the harsh restrictions that were in place in Finland in the first part of the year, which prevented the club members from training until just nine weeks before the beginning of the (once again shortened) season. As a partial consequence, all three teams suffered a shortage of roster depth which only aggravated as the season progressed and injuries occurred.

Despite strong wins against Porvoo (45-8), Kuopio (111-0) and Turku (38-14), Big Guns lost the city derby against Warriors (7-27) and had to go through semifinals for a shot at the title. After coming out victorious in a fought match against Porvoo (20-10), Big Guns retained their sixth championship win in a nervewrecking final in Tampere against Warriors, after a late penalty kick from Joonas Bask sealed the score 15-12 for HRC. Also, Jake Pratley won the Coach of the Year award.

Blue Tigers, plagued by injuries, could not repeat the positive year they had in 2020, concluding the regular season in Division 1 last place and being relegated to Division 2 for the next season.

Ladies entered the 2021 season as a strong title contender, defeating Jyväskylä (36-0), Warriors (50-0) and Turku Swans (32-5) and showing to be able to compete against reigning champions Tampere (5-10). Despite a large win in the semifinal against Turku Swans (41-10), Ladies came up short in the fight for the title due to a heartbreaking loss in the final rematch against Tampere (7-18). HRC utility back Heidi Hennessy won the Player of the Year award.

2022 Season 
The 2022 XVs season featured the return of a full schedule after two years of pandemic, and started with a big structural change for HRC: Jake Pratley, who also took over the role of Head Coach of the Finnish Women's XV National Team during the offseason, was named Director of Rugby, with the goal of starting a new cycle for all three club teams.

Similarly to other teams, HRC struggled in the offseason, as the cold temperature that lasted until late May prevented the use of the home training field in Myllypuro. However, the regular season proved successful for HRC, as both Big Guns and Ladies concluded in first place and qualified directly for the Championship Final in Turku. Big Guns defeated Warriors (45-15) and retrieved their 7th national title. Ladies ended the championship drought, emerging on top in the final against Tampere (37-17). This marked the second time the Club achieved a double (the first since 2016) and the longest winning streak for the Men's team.

Jake Pratley was named Coach of the Year and Sanna-Kaisa Lintu won the Player of the Year award. Mikko Moilanen reached his 100th XVs cap with HRC.

7s

2020-2021 Seasons 
In 2020 and 2021, the Finnish 7's championship was not held due to the COVID-19 restrictions over sports in Finland.

2022 Season 
After two years of stop, the 7s series was finally brought back in 2022, with both HRC MiniGuns and Ladies entering as reigning champions after their respective victories in 2019. Mikko Moilanen returned as men's coach, while Leonardo Fierro took over as women's coach.

MiniGuns finished the series topping the East pool, with wins in Lahti 7s and Järvenpää 7s and a second place in Myyrmäki 7s. In the final tournament, HRC faced Turku Eagles (winner of the West pool) and Tampere (winner of the North pool), concluding as a runner-up behind Turku. Tiger Cubs ended in second place in the West pool and did not qualify for the finals.

Ladies saw bad luck affecting their season, as injuries and a Covid outbreak forced them out of two of the four tournaments in the series. The team scored a second place in Valkeakoski 7s and Tampere 7s, but did not participate in Järvenpää and Eerikkilä. Ladies took the third place overall in the series, which saw Tampere taking the trophy home and Warriors concluding as runner up.

Honours
 Finnish Championship League (Rugbyn SM-sarja) XV
 Men (7): 2002, 2003, 2014, 2016, 2020, 2021, 2022
 Women (4): 2015, 2016, 2019, 2022
 Finnish Championship League (Rugbyn SM-sarja) 7's
 Men (6): 2010, 2015, 2016, 2017, 2018, 2019
 Women (3): 2016, 2017, 2019
 Finnish Rugby Cup
 Men (2): 2003, 2005

Team Captains

References

External links
 Helsinki RC

Finnish rugby union teams
Rugby clubs established in 1999
1999 establishments in Finland
Sports clubs in Helsinki